The Gloucester Tree is a giant karri tree in the Gloucester National Park of Western Australia.

At 58 metres in height, it is the world's second tallest fire-lookout tree (second only to the nearby Dave Evans Bicentennial Tree), and visitors can climb up to a platform in its upper branches for views of the surrounding karri forest. It is owned by the Shire of Manjimup.

Built in 1947, the Gloucester Tree was one of eight karri trees that between 1937 and 1952 were made relatively easy to climb so that they could be used as fire lookout spots. The suitability of the tree as a fire lookout was tested by forester Jack Watson, who climbed the tree using climbing boots and a belt. It took Watson six hours to climb 58 metres, a difficult climb due to the 7.3 metre girth of the tree and the need to negotiate through limbs from 39.6 metres up. 
Jack Watson, a Gallipoli veteran, was also Superintendent of Kings Park in Perth, and retired from that position in 1962.

Another forester, George Reynolds, pegged the ladder and lopped branches to facilitate climbing the tree, and a wooden lookout cabin was built 58 metres above the ground. The Governor-General of Australia, Prince Henry, Duke of Gloucester, visited the site during construction, and the tree and national park are named in his honour.

The wooden lookout cabin was demolished in 1973 for safety reasons, and was replaced with a steel and aluminium cabin and visitors' gallery. Currently the climb is done by stepping on 153 spikes that spiral the tree.

Only 20 percent of visitors climb to the top of the tree; most make it only part of the way before turning back.

See also

Dave Evans Bicentennial Tree
Diamond Tree
List of individual trees

References

External links

 Gloucester National Park – Department of Environment and Conservation

Pemberton, Western Australia
Individual eucalypts
Forests of Western Australia
Fire lookout towers in Australia
Lookout trees
Individual trees in Western Australia